This article contains an overview of the year 1996 in athletics.

Major Events

World

Olympic Games
Summer Paralympics
World Cross Country Championships
World Half Marathon Championships
Grand Prix Final
World Junior Championships

Regional

African Championships
CARIFTA Games
Central American and Caribbean Junior Championships
European Indoor Championships
European Cross Country Championships
Ibero-American Championships
South American Junior Championships
South American Youth Championships

World records

Men

Women

note that records for the women's 3000 m steeplechase were not officially recognised until 2000

Awards

Men

Women

Season's bests

References

1996 in athletics (track and field)
Athletics (track and field) by year